Helen Catherine Burkart (née Barnett, born 13 May 1958) is a retired British sprinter. As Helen Barnett, she competed in the women's 400 metres at the 1984 Summer Olympics. She represented England in the 200 metres event, at the 1982 Commonwealth Games in Brisbane, Queensland, Australia. Four years later she represented England in the 400 metres event, at the 1986 Commonwealth Games in Edinburgh, Scotland. She married the Swiss sprinter Stefan Burkart in 1986, and went on to represent Switzerland at the 1992 Summer Olympics in the women's 4 × 400 metres relay.

Personal life
Barnett married Stefan Burkart, who represented Switzerland at the 1992 and 1996 Summer Olympics. Their son Nishan Burkart is a footballer and a youth international with the Switzerland national under-20 football team.

References

External links
 

1958 births
Living people
Athletes (track and field) at the 1984 Summer Olympics
Athletes (track and field) at the 1992 Summer Olympics
British female sprinters
Swiss female sprinters
Olympic athletes of Great Britain
Olympic athletes of Switzerland
Place of birth missing (living people)
Athletes (track and field) at the 1982 Commonwealth Games
Athletes (track and field) at the 1986 Commonwealth Games
Commonwealth Games competitors for England
Olympic female sprinters